Juan Enrique Hayes (20 January 1891 – 25 July 1976) was an Argentine footballer, who played his entire career for Rosario Central (where he spent 20 years). Hayes also played for the Argentina national team.

Nicknamed Harry, Maestro, and Inglés, Hayes, with 221 official goals (including AFA and Liga Rosarina competitions) is the all-time leading top scorer in the history of Rosario Central. Moreover, Hayes is the most winning player with 20 official titles won (5 AFA championships, and 15 titles in Rosario regional leagues). His brother Ennis was another notable player for Rosario Central in the 1910s and 1920s.

Career 
Harry Hayes was the son of English immigrants who had travelled over to Argentina on a coal ship. He was born in the Arroyito district of Rosario in 1891. As a child he attended games at the Rosario Central and dreamed of becoming a footballer.

In 1906 he played a game for Club Argentino against Newell's Old Boys, for the benefit of Rosario Central. In 1905 he moved to Rosario Central with only 14 years old. In 1907 he made his debut with the senior squad, where he remained until his retirement in 1926. From 1907 to 1917 Hayes was called-up for the Argentina national team and other provincial sides 40 times.

Hayes' was acknowledged for being an extraordinary scorer with a strong shot, apart from his dribbling ability and precission for short passes and strong shots.

In 1910 Hayes made his debut for Argentina, in the unofficial South American Championship in 1910 (named Copa Centenario Revolución de Mayo, held as part of the celebrations of the Argentina Centennial), where he debuted scoring to Chile. Hayes (the second player in Rosario Central's history to be called up for Argentina after Zenón Díaz) went on to play 21 games for his country, scoring 8 goals, being also part of the Argentina squad for the 1916 South American Championship, the first official national team competition in the continent.

Post-playing career 
After retiring from football, Hayes worked as advisor for Rosario Central, being also coach in the Liga Rosarina de Football.

Personal life 
Hayes' brother Ennis was also a notable footballer for Rosario Central and Argentina, and his son Enrique Ricardo (also commonly called "Harry") played for Rosario Central in the 1930s and 40s.

In his own words 
There is a version that Alumni's legend Jorge Brown invited Hayes to join his team, but Hayes declined the offer stating that "I live for Rosario Central", which granted him a congratulation from Brown, who replied "I would have done the same for Alumni".

During an interview with El Gráfico in 1961, Hayes said: "I don't like football today. Teams play not to lose, and that denatures the game"... "Making friends like I had and have nowadays, meeting celebrities, visiting countries, is what I received from football. And that's what I am intimately grateful without thinking that playing in professional era would have been more convenient (in economic terms) for me".

Honours

 Copa de Competencia La Nación: 1913
 Copa Ibarguren: 1915
 Copa Honor MCBA: 1916 
 Copa de Competencia Jockey Club: 1916 
 Copa Competencia (AAmF): 1920
 Copa Nicasio Vila (7): 1908, 1914, 1915, 1916, 1917, 1919, 1923
 Copa Damas de Caridad: 1910, 1914, 1915, 1916
 Federación Rosarina de Football: 1913
 Asociación Amateurs Rosarina de Football: 1920, 1921
 Copa Estímulo: 1922

Argentina
 Copa Centenario Revolución de Mayo: 1910
 Copa Newton: 1911
 Copa Premier Honor Argentino: 1911, 1913
 Copa Premier Honor Uruguayo: 1915
 Copa Lipton: 1915, 1916
 Copa Círculo de la Prensa: 1916

Notes

References

1891 births
1976 deaths
Footballers from Rosario, Santa Fe
Argentine footballers
Argentina international footballers
Association football forwards
Rosario Central footballers
Argentine people of English descent